is a Japanese voice actress, actress, singer, and narrator. She was affiliated with Arts Vision and Lasley Arrow, but is now freelance. Mitsuishi lived in Nagareyama, Chiba. She graduated from high school and entered the Katsuta Voice Actor's Academy in 1986. She is well known for her roles as Usagi Tsukino in Sailor Moon, Misato Katsuragi in Neon Genesis Evangelion, Boa Hancock in One Piece, Murrue Ramius, Haro and Narrator in Mobile Suit Gundam SEED and Mobile Suit Gundam SEED DESTINY.

Early life
Kotono Mitsuishi was born on December 8, 1967 in Toda, Saitama Prefecture and raised in Tokyo, Japan. She graduated high school in 1986 and later entered the Katsuta Seiyū Academy. She then debuted as Seiyū in 1989. She is also known for her role of Sailor Moon in the manga and anime series of the same name since 1992. In 2011, she was the voice of Hummy in Suite PreCure.

Personal life
She is married with one daughter.

Filmography

Television anime

Original video animation (OVA)

Anime films

Video games

Dubbing

Live Action

Discography

Solo

1993: Mo' Merry [PICA-1010]
1994: A・Ha・Ha [PICA-1027]
1994: Cotton Colour [PICA-1036]
1995: Birthday of the Sun [PICA-1061]
1995: Koto-cha wan no Itsumoissho Kenmei – Kotochawanderland [PICA-1079]
1996: Yasashi Otona ni Naru Tame ni [PICA-1094]
1998: Niku to Kokoro [TYCY-5608/9]

In Seiyuu Groups

Peach Hips (1992–present)

Humming Bird (1993–1995)

1993: Hummingbird FIRST FLIGHT [TYCY-5311]
1993: ハミングバード　太陽と裸 [TYCY-5316]
1993: 熱狂の"裸・Eve" Summer Aviation Tour '93 [TYCY-5337]
1994: ハミングバード '94夏 トラ・トラ・トラ！ [TYCY-5391]
1994: ハミングバード外伝"ザッツ・ミュージカル"卯月の反乱～こんな日が来るなんて [TYCY-5398]
1995: ハミングバードザッピングＣＤ – Vols. 1–5 [TYCY-5418 – TYCY-5422]
1995: ハミングバード 山虎 '95風の唄＆夢の場所へ [TYCY-5441]
1995: さよならハミングバード [TYCY-5450]
1995: Hummingbird GRAND FINALE at SHIBUYA-Kokaido [TYCY-5462/3]
1995: Hummingbird SISTERS [TYCY-5471]

Angels (1996–1998)

1997: THE SONG FOR SONGS [NACL-1274]
1998: THE SONG FOR SONGS 2 [COR-14921]

Radio

Mitsuishi Kotono · Bukkatsu Shiyo!
Mitsuishi Kotono no Eberu Nights
Mitsuishi Kotono no Eberu Nights II
Stardust Dream

Other

Hakkutsu! Aru Aru Daijiten (narrator)
I Wish You Were Here (internet streaming broadcast)
Koe · Asobu Club
Nandemo Q (NHK) (narrator, Urara, multiple other characters)
Neon Genesis Evangelion pachinko and pachinko slots series (Misato Katsuragi)
Seishun Adventure: Īsha no Fune (Īsha no Fune)
Tatta Hitotsu no Chikyū (Otohime)
Uchi Kuru!? (narrator)

References

External links
 

1967 births
Living people
Arts Vision voice actors
Japanese video game actresses
Japanese voice actresses
People from Nagareyama
Voice actresses from Saitama Prefecture
Voice actresses from Tokyo
20th-century Japanese actresses
21st-century Japanese actresses